A total solar eclipse occurred on November 22, 1984. A solar eclipse occurs when the Moon passes between Earth and the Sun, thereby totally or partly obscuring the image of the Sun for a viewer on Earth. A total solar eclipse occurs when the Moon's apparent diameter is larger than the Sun's, blocking all direct sunlight, turning day into darkness. Totality occurs in a narrow path across Earth's surface, with the partial solar eclipse visible over a surrounding region thousands of kilometres wide. Totality was visible in Indonesia, Papua New Guinea and southern Pacific Ocean. West of the International Date Line the eclipse took place on November 23, including all land in the path of totality. Occurring only 2.1 days after perigee (Perigee on November 20, 1984), the Moon's apparent diameter was fairly larger.

Related eclipses

Eclipses of 1984 
 A penumbral lunar eclipse on May 15.
 An annular solar eclipse on May 30.
 A penumbral lunar eclipse on June 13.
 A penumbral lunar eclipse on November 8.
 A total solar eclipse on November 22.

Solar eclipses of 1982–1985

Saros 142

Inex series

Metonic series

Notes

References 

1984 11 22
1984 in science
1984 11 22
November 1984 events
1984 in Indonesia
1984 in Papua New Guinea